Toomas "Topi" Heikkinen (born 27 March 1991) is a rallycross and ice-racing driver from Finland. He won the Finnish Rallycross Championship in 2010 and the Global Rallycross Championship in 2013. He currently competes in the FIA World Rallycross Championship Supercar category, driving for EKS racing team.

Heikkinen began his racing career in karting, later moving up to single-seater formula. He switched to rallycross in 2010.

Racing record

Complete FIA European Rallycross Championship results
(key)

Division 1

Supercar

Complete Global RallyCross Championship results
(key)

Supercar

Complete FIA World Rallycross Championship results
(key)

Supercar

References

External links

1991 births
Living people
Finnish racing drivers
World Rallycross Championship drivers
Audi Sport TT Cup drivers
Global RallyCross Championship drivers
European Rallycross Championship drivers
World Rally Championship drivers
People from Joensuu
Sportspeople from North Karelia
Finland Formula Renault 2.0 drivers
Formula Renault 2.0 NEC drivers
Koiranen GP drivers